Phil LeBeau is a top reporter for CNBC. He started out at Lyons Township High School's WLTL radio station. At CNBC he reports on the automotive sector and airline industry. He is based at the network's Chicago bureau and edits the "Behind the Wheel" section on CNBC's CNBC.com website. He has also hosted documentaries on the channel including "Dreamliner: Inside the World's Most Anticipated Airplane", "Ford: Rebuilding an American Icon", and "Saving General Motors".

LeBeau graduated from the University of Missouri's Columbia School of Journalism with a bachelor's degree in journalism and broadcasting. Before joining CNBC he was a media relations specialist for Van Kampen Funds. He was also a general reporter at KCNC-TV in Denver and KAKE-TV in Wichita, Kansas. His television career began as field producer on consumer stories at WCCO-TV in Minneapolis, Minnesota.

See also
List of CNBC personalities

References

University of Missouri alumni
CNBC people